"The Merchants of Venus", also known by the title "The Merchants of Venus Underground", is a science fiction novella by American writer Frederik Pohl published in 1972 as part of the collection The Gold at the Starbow's End.

It is a satire of runaway free market capitalism. It also features the first appearance of the Heechee.

Plot
The story is about Audee Walthers, an "airbody driver and tour operator", who scams Earth tourists who visit Venus. He needs a new liver, so he is seeking a rich client to profit from. He is pleased to meet the seemingly well-off Boyce Cochenour. However, Walthers finds out that Cochenour also needs money.

Adaptation
The story was adapted as a graphic novel by Victoria Petersen and Neal McPheeters in 1986, as the fourth title in the DC Science Fiction Graphic Novel series.

References

External links

1972 short stories
Works by Frederik Pohl
Short stories set on Venus